Happy Mother's Day, Love George (also known Run Stranger, Run) is a 1973 American mystery film produced and directed by Darren McGavin. The film stars Patricia Neal, Cloris Leachman, Bobby Darin (his last acting role),  Tessa Dahl, Ron Howard, Kathie Browne, Joe Mascolo, Simon Oakland, and Thayer David.

Plot
Johnny Hanson is a teenager who arrives at a remote fishing village in New England. He goes to Ronda's Cafe, where he timidly sits at a table. When the owner Ronda Carlson comes to take his order, he asks her name, and when she replies, he abruptly departs. Shaken, Ronda returns to the kitchen where Eddie Martin, the cook and her boyfriend, asks if that was him and she nods her head 'yes'.

Johnny walks to a residential neighborhood and sits outside one of the houses. The house belongs to Ronda's sister Cara, and when Cara's teenage daughter Celia comes outside to fetch the morning newspaper, she sees Johnny and smiles. Noticing her daughter's interest in the young stranger, the cantankerous Cara upbraids Celia, then turns her anger on her son Porgie, and later abuses Porgie's wife Yolanda, whom Cara considers a tramp.

As Johnny walks down the road, Roy, the town's police chief, pulls him over and takes him to the police station for questioning. After Roy frisks Johnny, he finds several letters, and when Johnny demands their return, Roy explains that the town is on edge because several people have disappeared over the last few months and it is therefore his obligation to question every stranger. Upon reading the letters, Roy discovers that Johnny is the son Ronda gave away for adoption years earlier. Johnny then informs Roy that he has come to town to learn his father's identity, but Roy warns him not to unearth old secrets and to leave town right away.

After Roy releases him, Johnny walks past Cara's house and Celia beckons him inside, then pulls him into the attic. From the attic window, Celia spies on her womanizing neighbor Piccolo as he seduces Crystal, his married mistress in the garden. Celia then turns to Johnny and tries to seduce him, but he is not interested. Johnny tells Celia that he discovered Ronda was his mother when he found some letters she had sent to Johnny's foster parents. Stating that Cara is Ronda's estranged sister, Celia takes Johnny into her late father's office and shows him some old family photos of her father, who died before she was born. When Cara returns home, Celia locks Johnny in the office, but he escapes through a window later that night.

At the cafe, Eddie demands to know if Ronda intends to allow Johnny to live there. When Ronda answers 'yes', Eddie, intolerant of the situation, takes his pay and announces that he is quitting, as well as leaving Ronda. Finding Johnny outside, Eddie beats up him in anger. Hearing noises, Ronda hurries outside and, finding the bloodied Johnny, helps him into her house. There Johnny sees that Ronda has tacked his baby and boyhood pictures onto the wall, and Ronda confesses her regret over giving him up as a baby. Johnny demands to know who his father was, and when Ronda refuses to tell him, he leaves.

Johnny attends church that Sunday, and afterward, Cara's gossipy neighbor, Florence, invites him to have some fresh baked bread at her house. As they sit at the table, Florence reveals that Cara and Ronda have not spoken since the day that Cara's husband George (Johnny's father) was stabbed and murdered in his front yard.

Later, Porgie visits his sympathetic aunt Ronda, who reveals that Johnny is her son and asks him to pass the information to Cara. Porgie, who has been continually disparaged by his mother, suggest that Ronda tell her herself. Celia, meanwhile, has continued to spy on Piccolo and Crystal through the attic window, from which she throws a paper airplane containing a message to meet her at the summer house that afternoon.

Crystal, who is amused by Celia's infatuation with Piccolo, insists that he attend and accompanies him there, waiting outside as he goes in to keep his rendezvous. When Piccolo fails to reappear, Crystal enters and finds Piccolo's dead body lying on the floor. Panicked, Crystal tries to run out the door, and finding it locked, races from room to room, looking for an escape. After discovering another dead body in the bathtub, Crystal turns to see Celia standing in the hallway with a cleaver in her hand. Terrified, Crystal jumps out a window and falls to her death.

Meanwhile, as Porgie and his friend Bomber troll the waters for fish, their net pulls up a dead body. That night, Johnny visits Ronda and demands to know his father's name. As Johnny leafs through some old photo albums, Ronda informs him that his father is dead. Finding a clipping about his father in the album, Johnny snatches it and runs to Cara's house, where he confronts Cara and announces that he knows that her husband George was his father.

Upon returning home, Celia goes to the kitchen, extracts a knife from the drawer, then eavesdrops from the hallway as Cara admits that upon discovering that George had an affair with her sister, she stabbed her stomach with a knife to abort her unborn fetus. The baby, Celia, survived, but was born mentally deranged. Cara then admits to stabbing and killing George in a jealous rage. Offering to give Johnny George's watches and rings, Cara goes upstairs to her bedroom to retrieve them. As Johnny waits in the living room, he hears Cara scream, and sees Celia running down the stairs. Rushing into Cara's bedroom, Johnny finds that she has been stabbed in the throat with a knife. Johnny nervously paces the hallways in search of Celia, and when he walks out the door, she assaults him with the knife and they struggle for possession of the weapon...

The next morning, Celia is locked in a police car by Roy and taken away to jail as Johnny hitches a ride out of town.

Cast
 Patricia Neal as Cara
 Cloris Leachman as Ronda
 Bobby Darin as Eddie
 Tessa Dahl as Celia
 Ron Howard as Johnny
 Kathie Browne as Crystal
 Joe Mascolo as Piccolo
 Simon Oakland as Sheriff Roy
 Thayer David as Minister Pollard

Reception

Critical response
Roger Greenspun of The New York Times wrote in his review: "Anybody who has seen half a movie in his life will instantly recognize that a title like Happy Mothers' Day, Love George has to indicate gothic horror. In this case, coastal gothic horror, as young Johnny (Ron Howard) returns to the New England fishing village of his childhood, in search of a father he has never known. It is one of those towns where everyone seems to have a skeleton in the closet. Actually, a skeleton in the closet would be a blessing. This town has two skeletons on the beach (under the beach, to be precise), a corpse in the master bedroom, another corpse in the summer house's upstairs bathtub, two more in guest rooms, a third in the overgrown front yard, a fourth fresh-killed in the garage, and still another fouling up the nets in the nearby fishing grounds. There may have been more. I didn't notice. Johnny never finds his father — mainly because his father, what is left of his father, can be found only at low spring tides during a strong offshore wind. But he does find his mother (Cloris Leachman), and his aunt (Patricia Neal), the local down-at-the heels aristocrat, who is also his father's widow. Eventually he finds the identity of the murderer, an identity that should keep you guessing for at least the first six minutes of the movie. Happy Mothers' Day, Love George makes use of several distinguished performers. Cloris Leachman was seen to better advantage in The Last Picture Show. Ron Howard is currently seen to better advantage in American Graffiti. And Patricia Neal may be seen to better advantage any time in Maxim Coffee television commercials. In this, his first directorial assignment, Darren McGavin has come up to just about the level of his material, which is very low. The locations, actually in Nova Scotia, are predictably lovely. There is some sense of place (the great gift of the provincial horror movie), but no sense of purpose, or of a reasonable inevitable doom. Happy Mothers' Day, Love George, opened yesterday at the Plaza and New Embassy theaters.

Production
Happy Mother's Day, Love George was produced and directed by Darren McGavin. The film was written by Robert Clouse. Cinematography was done by Walter Lassally. Film editing was done by George Grenville. The score was composed by Don Vencent.

Release
Happy Mother's Day, Love George was released in theatres on August 17, 1973. The film was released on VHS on August 2, 1989.

References

Sources

External links

1973 films
1970s mystery films
Films shot in Nova Scotia
American mystery films
1970s English-language films
1970s American films